Concordia International School is a private, Christian, international school located in Pudong, Shanghai, China. Founded in 1998, the school is a part of the Lutheran Church–Missouri Synod (LCMS). The school's opening came after extensive feasibility research and numerous requests for a school from the Hong Kong corporate community.

History
Concordia was founded in 1998 and has grown from 22 students and 14 staff members under founder Allan Schmidt to its current enrollment of over 1,200 students from pre-K to grade 12 under the direction of Steve Winkelman, the head of school.

The school opened its new elementary school building (which replaced an existing structure) and the David F. Rittmann Fine Arts Center (which includes a 450-seat theater to support the drama program, 2D and 3D art rooms, an art gallery, band/choir/orchestra rooms, and music practice rooms) in August 2007.

Concordia added a new welcome center, cooking studio, drama room, business center, student media center, artificial turf, and a blue track to the school for the 2015/2016 school year. Concordia added new wall extensions, enclosing passages between and into buildings, a new music department office, a new Luther meeting room, and a middle school classroom for the start of the 2016/2017 school year (where the old Luther room used to be).

In 2018, following the food safety scandal at the Shanghai SMIC Private School, the Shanghai Municipal Food and Drug Administration conducted an investigation of other cafeterias in the city operated by Eurest, a subsidiary of Compass Group. The government agency discovered a bottle of expired seasoning in the cafeteria and expired bread in a nearby garbage bin. The school was ordered to terminate its relationship with Eurest.

In 2019, the school paid a $4 million dividend to the LCMS, which helped to retire the $15 million debt the LCMS had accumulated over the years.

Religious affiliation
Concordia follows the traditional education of the LCMS. This educational system focuses on three major components: body, mind, and spirit. Concordia International School Shanghai is one of the LCMS's three international schools in Asia. Concordia welcomes students and families of all faiths.

Programs and services
Concordia International School Shanghai offers several programs throughout the year for students from pre-K to grade 12. Programs range from sports such as soccer, softball, tennis, swimming, basketball, volleyball, baseball, cross country, track, and ultimate frisbee.

Concordia is a member of the Asia Pacific Activities Conference which hosts competition events for international schools in China, Hong Kong, Vietnam, Japan, South Korea, and the Philippines. Concordia also participates in APAC with various athletics and arts teams.

Concordia International School Shanghai is accredited by the Western Association of Schools and Colleges (WASC). In addition, Concordia is also a member of associations, such as ACAMIS and EARCOS.

School statistics 
 32: The number of nations represented by the Concordia student body
 1,167: Student enrollment for the 2016-2017 school year 
 31%: Percentage of Concordia teachers with bachelor's degrees pursuing graduate degrees
 62%: Percentage of Concordia teachers with over 10 years teaching experience
 12%: Average annual teacher turnover from 2010-2014

A full list of school report can be seen at Concordia's website.

See also
List of international schools in Shanghai
Americans in China

References

External links
Concordia International School Shanghai
Concordia school profile on Time Out Shanghai Family
Concordia International Shanghai Profile on SmartShanghai.com

International schools in Shanghai
International schools in China
Private schools in Shanghai
American international schools in China
International Baccalaureate schools in China
Association of China and Mongolia International Schools
Secondary schools affiliated with the Lutheran Church–Missouri Synod